The NeuraJet Neura Jet is an Austrian paramotor that was designed by Hans Neudorfer and produced by NeuraJet of Senftenbach for powered paragliding. Now out of production, when it was available the aircraft was supplied complete and ready-to-fly.

Confusingly the company name is NeuraJet, while the aircraft model is the Neura Jet.

Design and development
It was designed to comply with the US FAR 103 Ultralight Vehicles rules as well as European regulations. It features a paraglider-style wing, single-place accommodation and a single  Husqvarna chainsaw engine in pusher configuration with a 4.1:1 ratio reduction drive and a  diameter three-bladed composite propeller.

As is the case with all paramotors, take-off and landing is accomplished by foot. Inflight steering is accomplished via handles that actuate the canopy brakes, creating roll and yaw.

Specifications (Neura Jet)

References

Neura Jet
2000s Austrian ultralight aircraft
Single-engined pusher aircraft
Paramotors